White v Bluett (1853) 23 LJ Ex 36 is an English contract law case, concerning the scope of consideration in English law.

Facts
Mr Bluett had lent his son some money. Mr Bluett died. The executor of Mr Bluett's estate was Mr White. He sued the son to pay back the money. In his defense, the son argued that his father had said the son need not repay if the son would stop complaining about how Mr Bluett would distribute his property in his will among the children.

Judgment
Pollock CB held there was no consideration for any discharge of the obligation to repay. The son had ‘no right to complain’ anyway. Not complaining was therefore an entirely intangible benefit.

Baron Alderson added this.

See also
Bret v JS (1600) Cro Eliz 756
Hamer v Sidway (1891) 27 NE 256
Pitt v PHH Asset Management Ltd
Williams v Roffey Bros

References

1853 in case law
1853 in England
English enforceability case law
English consideration case law
1853 in British law
Court of Exchequer Chamber cases